Charlie, the Lonesome Cougar is a 1967 American adventure drama film produced by Walt Disney Productions and directed by Winston Hibler. Originally released on October 19, 1967 as part of a double bill with The Jungle Book, it was filmed partially at the Weyerhauser Mill in Enumclaw, Washington and partially on the North Fork of the Clearwater River in North Central Idaho, recording one of the last river log drives to occur in the United States. Four different cougars were used in the film.

Plot
The film takes place in the Cascade Mountains of Washington (despite much of the filming having been done in North Central Idaho).

Charlie the cougar's mother lost her life when he was a cub, leaving him alone.  Jess Bradley finds Charlie, takes him in and raises him. Charlie experiences some adventures growing up including some play time with a black bear cub and visits to his friend Potlatch for snacks. Potlatch has a Smooth Fox Terrier named Chainsaw, Charlie's nemesis, in the logging camp where Charlie grows up. This rivalry leads to problems, including a wrecked kitchen and a trip down the river as part of the logging crew. This leads to more problems including another destroyed kitchen. This costs the lumberjack company a great deal of money, Charlie is let go and tied up, until he hears and sees some of the employees involved with a log standing contest. Charlie enters the contest but when Chainsaw distracts him, Charlie loses his concentration and fall off the log into the water. The contest ends when the boss forces the other employees back to work. Jess is forced to have to leave Charlie at home forever.

Jess, in the meantime, has found himself a girlfriend and gets engaged. Jess is forced to lock Charlie in a cage which doesn't hold him very long. Charlie hears a call from a female cougar in the distance one night and he decides to break free to investigate. The two had a good time together, but it quickly turns sour when his new friend wouldn't share a meal she had recently caught. Charlie then moves on and finds himself a free meal from a farmer milking his cows. This does not turn out well for Charlie and havoc ensues on the farm.

Charlie finds himself lost and on his own. He spends the summer hunting and getting by until one day when he becomes hunted by a pack of dogs. He manages to escape by going on a log down a flume, until he hits some bushes in the way, causing him to get off the flume, and eventually finds himself back at the logging camp. However, after spending the summer in the wild, his natural instincts have kicked in and he's more wild than tame now. When Chainsaw discovers Charlie, Charlie runs and gets trapped in a lift on the ground. The bosses men are about to shoot Charlie, until Jess comes to the rescue. He rescues Charlie from the lift. Ultimately, Jess has no option but to release him back into the wild, but in a nature preserve, where the cougars and other wild animals are protected from hunters, dogs, and other predators. There he finds the same female cougar, and lives happily ever after. This cougar is loved all around the world.

Cast
Ron Brown as Jess Bradley
Brian Russell as Potlatch
Chainsaw as himself
Linda Wallace as Jess's Fiancee (Unspoken)
Jim Wilson as Farmer
Lewis Sample as Chief Engineer
Clifford Peterson as Mill Manager
Edward C. Moller as Mill Hand
Rex Allen as narrator (voice)

See also
List of American films of 1967

References

External links
 
 
 
 

1967 films
Walt Disney Pictures films
1960s adventure drama films
American adventure drama films
Fictional mountain lions
Films set in Washington (state)
Films shot in Washington (state)
Films about cougars
Films about dogs
1967 drama films
Films with screenplays by Winston Hibler
Films produced by Walt Disney
Films directed by Winston Hibler
Films produced by Winston Hibler
1960s English-language films
1960s American films